Bomi-2 is an electoral district for the elections to the House of Representatives of Liberia. The district covers the Klay District (except Gonjeh community), as well as the Maher community of Senjeh District and 4 communities of Dewoin District - Beh, Gbaigbon, Vortor and Manjama.

Elected representatives

References

Electoral districts in Liberia